Matteo Giupponi (born 8 October 1988) is a male Italian racewalker who was bronze medal at the 2022 European Athletics Championships.

He is engaged to the Italian racewalker Eleonora Giorgi.

Career
He competed at the 2013, 2015, 2017 and 2019 editions of the World Athletics Championships and in 20 km and 50 km at the 2016 Summer Olympics.

Achievements

National titles
Giupponi won four national championships at individual senior level.
Italian Athletics Championships
10 km walk: 2013
35 km walk: 2022
50 km walk: 2014
Italian Athletics Indoor Championships
5000 m walk: 2014

See also
 Italy at the IAAF World Race Walking Cup
 Italy at the European Race Walking Cup

References

External links
 

Italian male racewalkers
Athletics competitors of Centro Sportivo Carabinieri
Living people
Place of birth missing (living people)
1988 births
World Athletics Championships athletes for Italy
Athletes (track and field) at the 2016 Summer Olympics
Olympic athletes of Italy
European Athletics Championships medalists
21st-century Italian people